Calls is a 2021 Indian Tamil-language crime thriller film written and directed by J. Sabarish. The film stars V. J. Chitra, Vinodhini, Devadarshini and R. Sundarrajan. The film also marks the posthumous release of Chitra who also made her first and only film appearance. The film is loosely inspired by Aruvi. The film had its theatrical release on 26 February 2021 and opened to negative reviews from critics.

Plot 
Nandhini takes a job at a call centre due to her family situation. Her manager challenges her with renewing the subscriptions of at least 20 customers in a day or she will be fired.

Cast

Production 
In September 2019, it was revealed that the television soap opera actress V. J. Chitra would make her film acting debut. Chitra signed on to appear in her first Kollywood film role in mid-2019 through Calls. She was cast in the role of a business process outsourcing professional. Principal photography commenced in mid-2019 and wrapped in March 2020.

The filmmaker J. Sabarish initially planned to cast Riythvika in the lead role but he later changed his mind after noticing Riythvika taking part in the second edition of Bigg Boss Tamil. He then insisted to cast either Mahima Nambiar or Arthana Binu but both of them had reportedly turned down the offer. Sabarish finalized on VJ Chitra, who rose to limelight and prominence following her breakthrough performance through Star Vijay's television soap opera Pandian Stores.

Release 
The film initially supposed to have its theatrical release in July 2020 but it was postponed due to the COVID-19 pandemic. The filmmakers later confirmed the theatrical release of the film on 26 February 2021 and unveiled the official trailer of the film on 29 January 2021. It also marks the posthumous release of actress V. J. Chitra who died on 9 December 2020.

References

External links 

 

2021 crime thriller films
Indian crime thriller films
Films about organised crime in India